Flight of Fancy is a 2000 Puerto Rican film directed and co-written by Noel Quiñones.

Plot
A young single mother about to marry when a pilot crash-lands on her small island.

Cast
 Dean Cain as Clay Bennett
 Talisa Soto as Mercedes Marquez
 Miguel Sandoval as Frank
 Kristian de la Osa as Gabriel Marquez
 Juan Piedrahita as Milo
 Carmen Moreno as Lazette
 Ron Michaels as Rugged Field Worker

Reception
Flight of Fancy received three Hollywood Film Awards: "Best Latin Feature" for Noel Quiñones, "Best Family Film" and "Best Latino Film" for Tom Musca.

The Movie Scene gave the film three out of five stars, stating: "What this all boils down to is that "Flight of Fancy" is in truth a difficult movie to watch as you really have to be in the right mood for its innocent message driven storyline. But if you are it is a pleasant movie which will warm your heart."

References

External links 
 
 

2000 films
English-language Puerto Rican films
Puerto Rican films
Cinema of Puerto Rico
2000s English-language films